Sirimongkol Luksiripat was a Thai Muay Thai fighter.

Biography and career
Kasem Prapaisri was born in 1946 in Paedriew, Chachoengsao Province, once classmate with famous promotor Songchai Rattanasuban he had his first Muay Thai fight at the age of 17 using the ring name "Sukkasem Luksiyaek". During his second fight in his native province Kasem beat Usmannoi Luklong by knockout, Usmannoi would die from the injury sustained during the fight. The media reported on that event and he was dubbed "the Executionner from Padriew", it's with this reputation that he came to fight in Bangkok with very little experience using the ring name "Sukkasem Sor.Sanguansak". He lost his Bangkok debut in the first round. Victim of stage fright, the referee stopped the action thinking he was throwing the fight, his skillset not matching his reputation. He had to go back fighting in the provinces as he got banned from Rajadamnern Stadium. After a few wins he convinced the officials that he wasn't the kind of fighter to take dives and was welcomed back.

With a new promotor he went back to compete in Bangkok using his famous ring name "Sirimongkol Luksiripat". Under the Petchyindee promotion Sirimongkol started to rack up wins in the major stadiums. During his fighting career Sirimongkol gave a share of every purse he got to the family of the fighter he killed in the ring.

As a skilled southpaw he was one of the most dominant fighter of the Muay Thai circuit between 1969 and 1975 with wins over top fighters such as Vicharnnoi Porntawee, Kongdej Lookbangplasoy, Vichit Lookbangplasoy, Fahsai Taweechai, Bundit Singprakarn, Toshio Fujiwara. He was a two weight Lumpinee Stadium champion at 126 and 135 lbs. During this period Sirimongkol received purses as high as 100,000 baht.
Towards the end of his fighting career Sirimongkol competed in Japan multiple times. He definitely retired in 1980 and went to teach in Japan for a few years. Back in Thailand he worked in a travel company accommodating Japanese tourists.

Sirimongkol died on August 18, 2018, from a pulmonary oedema at the age of 71.

Titles and accomplishments

Muay Thai
Lumpinee Stadium
 1970 Lumpinee Stadium 126 lbs Champion
 1974 Lumpinee Stadium 135 lbs Champion

Amateur boxing
 1973 King's Royal Cup 

Awards
 1972 King's Fighter of the Year
 1973 Sports Writers Association Amateur Athlete of the Year
 Siam Sport Awards Hall of Fame (Muay Thai)

Muay Thai record

|-  bgcolor="#cfc"
| - || Win ||align=left| Tsuchiya || || Tokyo, Japan || KO || 4 ||

|-  bgcolor="#fbb"
| 1977-12-31 || Loss||align=left| Masanobu Sato|| || Tokyo, Japan || KO ||  || 
|-
! style=background:white colspan=9 |

|-  style="background:#cfc;"
| 1976-11-02 || Win ||align=left| Monsawan Lukchiangmai || Lumpinee Stadium || Bangkok, Thailand || Decision || 5 || 3:00
|-
! style=background:white colspan=9 |

|- style="text-align:center; background:#cfc;"
|1976-
|Win
| align="left" | Apidej Sit-Hirun
|
|Bangkok, Thailand
|TKO (Doctor stoppage)
|2
|

|-  style="background:#;"
| 1976-07-06 ||  ||align=left| Permsiri Rungrit|| Lumpinee Stadium || Bangkok, Thailand || ||  ||

|- style="text-align:center; background:#fbb;"
|1976-04-23
|Loss
| align="left" | Satanfah Sor.Prateep
|Lumpinee Stadium
|Bangkok, Thailand
|Decision
|5
|3:00

|-  bgcolor="#cfc"
| 1976-03-08 || Win ||align=left| Toshio Fujiwara || Rajadamnern Stadium || Bangkok, Thailand || Decision || 5 || 3:00

|-  style="background:#cfc;"
| 1976-02-01 || Win ||align=left| Mehmood Lukbothong||  || Hat Yai, Thailand || Decision || 5 || 3:00

|-  style="background:#fbb;"
| 1975-12-23 || Loss ||align=left| Pudpadnoi Worawut || Lumpinee Stadium || Bangkok, Thailand || Decision || 5 || 3:00

|-  style="background:#fbb;"
| 1975-11-04 || Loss ||align=left| Chalermpon Sor.Thai-it || Lumpinee Stadium || Bangkok, Thailand || Decision || 5 || 3:00

|-  style="background:#cfc;"
| 1975-08-29 || Win ||align=left| Wankaew Sityodtong || Lumpinee Stadium || Bangkok, Thailand || Decision || 5 || 3:00

|-  style="background:#cfc;"
| 1975-07-25 || Win ||align=left| Chalermpon Sor.Thai-it || Lumpinee Stadium || Bangkok, Thailand || Decision || 5 || 3:00

|-  style="background:#cfc;"
| 1975-06-13|| Win ||align=left| Wankaew Sityodtong || Lumpinee Stadium || Bangkok, Thailand || Decision || 5 || 3:00

|-  style="background:#fbb;"
| 1975-03-31 || Loss ||align=left| Ruengsak Porntawee || Rajadamnern Stadium || Bangkok, Thailand || Decision || 5 || 3:00

|-  style="background:#fbb;"
| 1975-02-07 || Loss ||align=left| Bundit Singprakarn || Lumpinee Stadium || Bangkok, Thailand || Decision || 5 || 3:00

|-  style="background:#fbb;"
| 1975-01-07 || Loss ||align=left| Vichit Lookbangplasoy || Lumpinee Stadium || Bangkok, Thailand || Decision || 5 || 3:00

|-  style="background:#cfc;"
| 1974-11-22 || Win ||align=left| Bangmod Lukbangkho || Lumpinee Stadium || Bangkok, Thailand || Decision || 5 || 3:00

|-  style="background:#cfc;"
| 1974-10-01 || Win||align=left| Bundit Singprakarn || Lumpinee Stadium || Bangkok, Thailand || Decision || 5 || 3:00

|-  style="background:#cfc;"
| 1974-08-12|| Win ||align=left| Karwak Kwanchaichonrabut ||  || Bangkok, Thailand || Decision || 5 || 3:00

|-  style="background:#cfc;"
| 1974-07-02|| Win ||align=left| Kongdej Lookbangplasoy ||  || Bangkok, Thailand || Decision || 5 || 3:00

|-  style="background:#fbb;"
| 1974-05-14 || Loss ||align=left| Saensak Muangsurin || Lumpinee Stadium || Bangkok, Thailand || KO (Left Cross) || 2 ||

|-  style="background:#cfc;"
| 1974-04-19 || Win ||align=left| Phayakphoom Phayakkhao || Lumpinee Stadium || Bangkok, Thailand || KO (Punch)|| 2 || 
|-
! style=background:white colspan=9 |

|-  style="background:#cfc;"
| 1973-10-26 || Win ||align=left| Vicharnnoi Porntawee|| Lumpinee Stadium || Bangkok, Thailand || Decision || 5 || 3:00

|-  style="background:#fbb;"
| 1973-09-07|| Loss ||align=left| Poot Lorlek|| Huamark Stadium || Bangkok, Thailand || Decision || 5 || 3:00

|-  style="background:#;"
| 1973-06-06||  ||align=left| Kongdej Lookbangplasoy || Lumpinee Stadium || Bangkok, Thailand || ||  || 
|-
|-  style="background:#cfc;"
| 1973-01-12 || Win ||align=left| Han Silathong|| Lumpinee Stadium || Bangkok, Thailand || TKO|| 1 || 

|-  style="background:#fbb;"
| 1972-07-21 || Loss ||align=left| Han Silathong || Lumpinee Stadium || Bangkok, Thailand || Decision || 5 || 3:00

|-  style="background:#cfc;"
| 1972-05-05 || Win ||align=left| Pansak Kiatcharoenchai || Lumpinee Stadium || Bangkok, Thailand || Decision || 5 || 3:00
|-
! style=background:white colspan=9 |
|-  style="background:#cfc;"
| 1972-03-17 || Win ||align=left| Khonmek Kachapichit || Lumpinee Stadium || Bangkok, Thailand || KO || 4 ||

|-  style="background:#cfc;"
| 1972-01-31 || Win ||align=left| Vicharnnoi Porntawee ||  || Bangkok, Thailand || Decision || 5 || 3:00

|-  style="background:#cfc;"
| 1971-11-26 || Win ||align=left| Pansak Kiatcharoenchai || Lumpinee Stadium || Bangkok, Thailand || Decision || 5 || 3:00

|-  style="background:#cfc;"
| 1971-10-29 || Win ||align=left| Fahsai Taweechai || Lumpinee Stadium || Bangkok, Thailand || Decision || 5 || 3:00

|-  style="background:#cfc;"
| 1971-|| Win ||align=left| Singhao Sor.Lukphithak|| Rajadamnern Stadium || Bangkok, Thailand || Decision || 5 || 3:00

|-  style="background:#fbb;"
| 1971-|| Loss||align=left| Han Silathong || Lumpinee Stadium || Bangkok, Thailand || Decision || 5 || 3:00

|-  style="background:#fbb;"
| 1971-05-11|| Loss||align=left| Srichang Sakornpitak || Lumpinee Stadium || Bangkok, Thailand || Decision || 5 || 3:00

|-  style="background:#cfc;"
| 1971-04-02|| Win ||align=left| Montien Muangsurin|| Huamark Stadium || Bangkok, Thailand || Decision || 5 || 3:00

|-  style="background:#cfc;"
| 1971-|| Win ||align=left| Denthoranee Muangsurin || Lumpinee Stadium || Bangkok, Thailand || Decision || 5 || 3:00

|-  style="background:#cfc;"
| 1971-|| Win ||align=left| Wisan Kriengkraiyuk || Lumpinee Stadium || Bangkok, Thailand || KO || 1 ||

|-  style="background:#cfc;"
| 1971-01-|| Win ||align=left| Sornnakhom Kiatvayupak || Lumpinee Stadium || Bangkok, Thailand || Decision || 5 || 3:00

|-  style="background:#cfc;"
| 1970- || Win ||align=left| Anantadej Sithiran || Lumpinee Stadium || Bangkok, Thailand || Decision || 5 || 3:00
|-
! style=background:white colspan=9 |

|-  style="background:#fbb;"
| 1970-06-19 || Loss ||align=left| Fahsai Taweechai || Lumpinee Stadium || Bangkok, Thailand || Decision || 5 || 3:00

|-  style="background:#cfc;"
| 1970-04-29 || Win ||align=left| Vicharnnoi Porntawee || Lumpinee Stadium || Bangkok, Thailand || Decision || 5 || 3:00

|-  style="background:#cfc;"
| 1969-11-07 || Win ||align=left| Norasing Lolita || Lumpinee Stadium || Bangkok, Thailand || TKO (Elbow) || 5 ||

|-  style="background:#cfc;"
| 1969-03-21 || Win ||align=left| Saknarongchai Luksrimongkol || Lumpinee Stadium || Bangkok, Thailand || Referee Stoppage || 3 ||

|-  style="background:#cfc;"
| 1969-01-31 || Win ||align=left| Nanna Muangsurin || Lumpinee Stadium || Bangkok, Thailand || TKO (Doctor Stoppage/Elbow) || 4 ||

|-  style="background:#fbb;"
| 1968-10-18 || Loss ||align=left| Duangjai Sor.Chaimongkol || Lumpinee Stadium || Bangkok, Thailand || Decision || 5 || 3:00

|-  style="background:#cfc;"
| 1965-03-11 || Win ||align=left| Han Silathong || Lumpinee Stadium || Bangkok, Thailand || TKO (Punches) || 1 ||

|-  style="background:#fbb;"
|  || Loss ||align=left| Sentek Wongwianyai || Lumpinee Stadium || Bangkok, Thailand || Referee Stoppage || 1 || 
|-
! style=background:white colspan=9 |

|-
| colspan=9 | Legend:

See more
List of Muay Thai practitioners

References

1946 births
2018 deaths
Thai male Muay Thai practitioners
Muay Thai trainers
People from Chachoengsao province